Mohammad Hasan (born 4 October 1990) is a Pakistani first-class cricketer who plays for Sindh. In April 2018, he was named in Khyber Pakhtunkhwa's squad for the 2018 Pakistan Cup. In March 2019, he was named in Sindh's squad for the 2019 Pakistan Cup. In September 2019, he was named in Sindh's squad for the 2019–20 Quaid-e-Azam Trophy tournament.

References

External links
 

1990 births
Living people
Pakistani cricketers
Karachi cricketers
Karachi Whites cricketers
Sindh cricketers
Cricketers from Karachi
Islamabad United cricketers